George Forbes (November 25, 1840 – December 17, 1925) was a merchant and political figure in Prince Edward Island. He represented 4th Queens in the Legislative Assembly of Prince Edward Island from 1886 to 1904 and from 1915 to 1919 as a Liberal member.

He was born in Hillsborough River, Prince Edward Island, the son of Malcolm Forbes. Forbes served as postmaster for Vernon Bridge where he also operated a store and shipping business. In 1877, he married Jessie Isabella Stewart. Forbes also served on the Board of Education.

References 
 George Forbes collection, Prince Edward Island Archival Network
 The Canadian parliamentary companion, 1887, JA Gemmill

1840 births
1925 deaths
People from Queens County, Prince Edward Island
Prince Edward Island Liberal Party MLAs